In statistical mechanics, probability theory, graph theory, etc. the random cluster model is a random graph that generalizes and unifies the Ising model, Potts model, and percolation model. It is used to study random combinatorial structures, electrical networks, etc. It is also referred to as the RC model or sometimes the FK representation after its founders Kees Fortuin and Piet Kasteleyn.

Definition 

Let  be a graph, and  be a bond configuration on the graph that maps each edge to a value of either 0 or 1. We say that a bond is closed on edge  if , and open if . Note that an open cluster can be a single vertex (if that vertex is not incident to any open bonds).

Suppose an edge is open independently with probability  and closed otherwise, then this is just the standard Bernoulli percolation process. The probability measure of a configuration  is given as

 

Given a configuration , we let  be the number of open clusters, or alternatively the number of connected components formed by the open bonds. Then for any , the probability measure of a configuration  is given as

 

Z is the partition function, or the sum over the unnormalized weights of all configurations,

 

The partition function of the RC model is a specialization of the Tutte polynomial, which itself is a specialization of the multivariate Tutte polynomial.

Special values of q 

The parameter  of the random cluster model can take arbitrary complex values. This includes the following special cases:

 : linear resistance networks.
 : negatively-correlated percolation.
 : the Ising model.
 : -state Potts model.

Edwards-Sokal representation 
The Edwards-Sokal (ES) representation of the Potts model is named after Robert G. Edwards and Alan D. Sokal. It provides a unified representation of the Potts and random cluster models in terms of a joint distribution of spin and bond configurations.

Let  be a graph, with the number of vertices being  and the number of edges being .
 
Importantly, the indicator function  enforces the following constraint,
 
meaning that a bond can only be open on an edge if the adjacent spins are of the same state, also known as the SW rule.

The statistics of the Potts spins can be recovered from the cluster statistics (and vice versa), thanks to the following features of the ES representation:

 The marginal measure  of the spins is the Boltzmann measure of the q-state Potts model at inverse temperature .
 The marginal measure  of the bonds is the random-cluster measure with parameters q and p.
 The conditional measure  of the spin represents a uniformly random assignment of spin states on each connect component.
 The conditional measure  of the bonds represents a percolation process (of ratio p) on edges where adjacent spins are aligned.

Frustration 
There are several complications of the ES representation once frustration is present in the spin model (e.g. the Ising model with both ferromagnetic and anti-ferromagnetic couplings in the same lattice). In particular, there is no longer a correspondence between the spin statistics and the cluster statistics, and the correlation length of the RC model will be greater than the correlation length of the spin model. This is the reason behind the inefficiency of the SW algorithm for simulating frustrated systems.

Two-dimensional case 

At the level of the partition function, the duality reads 

On a self-dual graph such as the square lattice, a phase transition can only occur at the self-dual coupling .

The random cluster model on a planar graph can be reformulated as a loop model on the corresponding medial graph. For a configuration  of the random cluster model, the corresponding loop configuration is the set of self-avoiding loops that separate the clusters from the dual clusters. In the transfer matrix approach, the loop model is written in terms of a Temperley-Lieb algebra with the parameter .

History and applications 
RC models were introduced in 1969 by Fortuin and Kasteleyn, mainly to solve combinatorial problems. After their founders, it is sometimes referred to as FK models. In 1971 they used it to obtain the FKG inequality. Post 1987, interest in the model and applications in statistical physics reignited. It became the inspiration for the Swendsen–Wang algorithm describing the time-evolution of Potts models. Michael Aizenman and coauthors used it to study the phase boundaries in 1D Ising and Potts models.

See also 

Tutte polynomial
Ising model
Random graph
Swendsen–Wang algorithm
FKG inequality

References

External links 
Random-Cluster Model – Wolfram MathWorld

Graph theory
Random graphs
Percolation theory
Statistical mechanics